The Regulatory Review is an online, daily publication devoted to coverage of regulatory news, analysis, and commentary. It is produced under the auspices of the Penn Program on Regulation and operated by students at the University of Pennsylvania Law School. The Regulatory Review's content includes essays produced by the publication's staff members as well as regular contributions from scholars, public officials, attorneys, and others interested in regulatory developments.

History 

The Regulatory Review dates to 2009, when it was originally known as RegBlog. At that time, University of Pennsylvania Law School Professor Cary Coglianese placed a blogging component on the website of the Penn Program on Regulation (PPR). Coglianese named the blog "RegBlog"—a name intended to convey the blog's purpose as a platform devoted to coverage of regulation. The blog's content initially comprised occasional short posts about regulatory news items and other related developments. 
 
Content was added to the site on an intermittent basis, until then-Penn Law student Jonathan Mincer presented a plan to create a student-run infrastructure based around the regular production of content. After that student-run organization became active, a new website was constructed for RegBlog that no longer relied on the stock blog functionality that had been built into the initial PPR website. RegBlog's new site was launched in April 2011, which marked the beginning of RegBlog as a publication in a form similar to what The Regulatory Review is today, featuring new content every weekday of the year.

A subsequent redesign of the RegBlog website was carried out in November 2013, an undertaking that involved placing RegBlog onto a new platform and giving it the graphical look that it retained until another redesign in March 2017.

This most recent redesign was part of a larger initiative by the members of RegBlog's 2016–2017 Editorial Board under the leadership of former editor-in-chief Kim Kirschenbaum. This initiative also included changing the publication's name in March 2017 from RegBlog to The Regulatory Review.

Content 

The Regulatory Review features coverage on regulatory topics, including administrative law, environmental regulation, financial regulation, health care, network neutrality, occupational safety and health, regulatory politics, telecommunications, and transportation, among other issues. It also features long-form essays written by contributors who occupy positions in government, academia, the nonprofit sector, and the private sector. In addition to publishing essays contributed by regulatory experts, The Regulatory Review features content authored by student staff members.

The Regulatory Review also periodically publishes "series," collections of essays organized around common themes or topics. Examples of notable series include "Regulating Police Use of Force," "Artificial Intelligence and the Administrative State," "A Debate over the Use of Cost-Benefit Analysis," "Rooting Out Regulatory Capture," "Bringing Expertise to the Gun Debate," "Comparing Nations’ Responses to COVID-19," "Racism, Regulation, and the Administrative State," and "Regulation in the Era of FinTech."

Recent leadership 

Professor Coglianese is the publication's faculty advisor.

Notable contributors

External links 
 
 Penn Program on Regulation

References 

University of Pennsylvania
American law journals
University of Pennsylvania Law School
Administrative law journals
Student newspapers published in Pennsylvania